Lee Wu-jong (August 1, 1923 – May 30, 2002) was a South Korean politician and feminist, labor right activist, Christian feminism activist and anti-Hoju activist from 1950s to 1980s. She was the 14th member of the National Assembly. and the leader of South Korean radical feminists. Lee Wujong was the granddaughter of Lee Hae-jo, a famous writer.

Site link 
 이우정:대한민국 국회의원 
 Lee Wu-jong 
 Lee Wu-jong

References 

1923 births
2002 deaths
Radical feminists
South Korean writers
South Korean educators
20th-century South Korean women politicians
20th-century South Korean politicians
South Korean feminists
South Korean journalists
South Korean women journalists
20th-century journalists